Patloni is an Indian village about  from Baldeo on the road joining to Agra. The foundation of Patlauni village was laid something in 1625

The village has about 10,000 residents and 5 intermediate colleges and one degree college.(GLR degree college)

Patloni / Patlauni is a village in Mahavan tehsil of Mathura district. It is very big village having population 10000. This village is business hub and centric location of nearby villages. It has educational institutions, co-operative societies, post office, cold storages, bank, water overhead tank and other facilities too.

Many native citizens of Patloni are government officers, defense officers, educationalist, industrialist and big political figures.
Professor Dr. D K Gautam (Kishori Raman Degree College) is from this village Patlauni.

Professor Dinesh Kumar Gautam is an internationally known Scientist in the field of Electronics Technology. He was born and brought up in this Patlauni village.

And from this village Akhil Gautam, the grandson of Late Shri Shivnandan Gautam (Baspuria), is working as a lieutenant in the Indian Army, who has got the distinction of joining the Indian Army (NDA) at the age of 16.

Social composition of village:
There are jat Brahmin, Vaishya, & Chamaar (SC) are main Hindu castes in this village. Roughly 
50% Brahmin (mainly Gautam)
20% Jat
5% Vaishya (mainly Mittal)
15% SC (mainly Chamar)
10% other castes

Business composition of village:
Mostly villagers dependent on farming. Few are in local business.
50%: Farming and government jobs
40%: Business
10%: Migrated outside

One more important point to add here it is that around 30% of family has at least one member of family is serving in Army.

Orkut Community
https://web.archive.org/web/20100108202310/http://www.orkut.com/Main#Community?rl=cpn&cmm=39703068

Map Link
http://www.wikimapia.org/#lat=27.379694&lon=77.8685188&z=17&l=0&m=b

Villages in Mathura district